The play-offs of the 2019 Fed Cup Europe/Africa Zone Group II were the final stages of the Group II zonal competition involving teams from Europe and Africa. Using the positions determined in their pools, the eight teams faced off to determine their placing in the 2019 Fed Cup Europe/Africa Zone Group II. The top two teams advanced to Group I, and the bottom two teams were relegated down to the Group III for the next year.

Pool results

Promotional play-offs 
The first-placed teams of each pool played against the second-placed teams of the other pool in head-to-head rounds. The winner of each round advanced to the 2020 Europe/Africa Zone Group I.

Austria vs. Israel

Luxembourg vs. Tunisia

Relegation play-offs 
The third-placed teams of the pools played against each other in a head-to-head round. The loser was relegated to the 2020 Europe/Africa Zone Group III alongside South Africa who finished last in Pool B.

Bosnia and Herzegovina vs. Portugal

Final placements 

References

External links 
 Fed Cup website

2019 Fed Cup Europe/Africa Zone